Phyllophaga implicita is a species of May beetle or junebug in the family Scarabaeidae.

References

Further reading

 
 
 
 
 
 
 
 

Melolonthinae